Rees Gephardt "Steamboat" Williams (January 31, 1892 – June 29, 1979) was a baseball player for the 1914 and 1916 St. Louis Cardinals.

Williams was born in Cascade, Montana, and was the first Montana-born player in Major League Baseball history. He batted left-handed and threw right-handed. He died in Deer River, Minnesota.

References

External links

1892 births
1979 deaths
St. Louis Cardinals players
Major League Baseball pitchers
Baseball players from Montana
People from Cascade, Montana
St. Paul Saints (AA) players
Milwaukee Brewers (minor league) players
Birmingham Barons players